The 1982–83 Iraq FA Cup was the seventh edition of the Iraq FA Cup as a clubs-only competition. The tournament was won by Al-Jaish for the second time, beating Al-Shabab 2–1 in the final, with Hassan Farhan and Sadiq Ghanim scoring for Al-Jaish and Falah Hassan scoring for Al-Shabab. The quarter-finals saw Al-Tayaran (now known as Al-Quwa Al-Jawiya) beat Al-Zawraa 2–1 in a Baghdad Derby on 5 January 1983 with Khalid Fadhel and Hanoon Mashkoor scoring for Al-Tayaran and Thamir Yousef scoring for Al-Zawraa, before Al-Tayaran were knocked out by Al-Shabab in the semi-final 4–2 on penalties.

Matches

Final

References

External links
 Iraqi Football Website

Iraq FA Cup
Cup